Between December 18–20, 2022, a deadly ice storm impacted numerous countries in Europe, causing 1,560 injuries and five fatalities.

Impacts

Netherlands and Belgium
Around 17:00 UTC on December 18, freezing rain began in Belgium and the Netherlands. Several car crashes occurred in both countries, resulting in three injuries and one fatality.

Germany
Starting around 22:00 UTC on December 18, the ice storm began to impact Germany. By the end of December 18, hundreds of car accidents had occurred in the North Rhine-Westphalia region of Germany, with 90 alone in Cologne. These car accidents resulted in eight injuries.

See also
Weather of 2022

References

2022 meteorology